Paul Balta (24 March 1929 – 27 January 2019) was a French journalist and writer.

Biography
After attending Lycée Louis-le-Grand, Balta decided to become a journalist. From 1970 to 1985, Balta specialized in the Middle East and Maghreb for Le Monde.Then, from 1987 to 1994, he directed the Center for Contemporary Oriental Studies at the New Sorbonne University Paris 3.

Balta died on 27 January 2019.

References

French male journalists
1929 births
2019 deaths
20th-century French writers
21st-century French writers